Point Sebago Resort is located in the Town of Casco, on the north shore of Sebago Lake, southern Maine's largest lake. Point Sebago opened in 1970 as a campground suitable for tents and trailers. Today the  resort has over 250 park homes on and around Sebago Lake, resort cottages and vacation homes on and around the 18-hole championship golf course. The Resort offers free supervised children's activities program, as well as family and adult activities to resort guests, and an off Broadway caliber entertainment program. Sebago Lake State Park lies just to its west.

The resort was started in 1970 by Larry Gould, who lived on the shore of the lake from 2008 until his death from a long-standing illness on February 13, 2015. The resort is now owned by Cove Communities.

References

External links
 

Resorts in Maine
Buildings and structures in Cumberland County, Maine
Tourist attractions in Cumberland County, Maine